A fortune teller is a form of origami used in children's games. Parts of the fortune teller are labelled with colors or numbers that serve as options for a player to choose from, and on the inside are eight flaps, each concealing a message. The person operating the fortune teller manipulates the device based on the choices made by the player, and finally one of the hidden messages is revealed. These messages may purport to answer questions (hence the name) or they may be activities that the player must perform.

The same shape may also be used as pincers or as a salt cellar. In connection with these other functions, it has also been called a cootie catcher, chatterbox, salt cellar, whirlybird, or paku-paku.

Construction
A paper fortune teller may be constructed by the steps shown in the illustration below:
 The corners of a sheet of paper are folded up to meet the opposite sides and (if the paper is not already square) the top is cut off, making a square sheet with diagonal creases.
 The four corners of the square are folded into the center, forming a shape known in origami terminology as a blintz base or cushion fold. The resulting smaller square is turned over, and the four corners are folded in a second time.
 All four corners are folded up so that the points meet in the middle, and the player works their fingers into the pockets of paper in each of the four corners.

Telling fortunes
To use the fortune teller, the person telling the fortunes holds the four corners of the paper with index fingers and thumbs on both hands, keeping two pairs of corners together and the other two pairs separated so that only half of the internal sides of the corners are visible.

Manipulations are done by various similar methods. In a common method, the player asks a question of the person holding the fortune teller; this question will be answered by the device. The holder then asks for a number or color. Once the number or color is chosen, the holder uses their fingers to switch between the two groups of colors and numbers inside the fortune teller. The holder switches these positions a number of times, determined by the number of letters in the color selected, the number originally chosen, or the sum of both. Once the holder has finished switching the positions of the fortune teller, the player chooses one of the flaps revealed. These flaps often have colors or numbers on them. The holder then lifts the flap and reveals the fortune underneath. Steps may be repeated to suit the users.

Other uses
As well as being used to tell fortunes, these shapes may be used as a pincer to play-act catching bugs such as lice, hence the "cootie catcher" name.

The "salt cellar" name refers to a different use for the same shape, in which it stands on a table with the four points downwards; the four open pockets may be used to hold small pieces of food.

In 2018, over 10,000 copies of this shape were used to create an installation resembling lava pouring from a building window, titled "ORIGAMI LAVA" (David Oliva + Anna Juncà), for the Lluèrnia festival in Olot, Spain.

History
This shape was introduced to the English-speaking world under the name salt cellar in the 1928 origami book Fun with Paper Folding. The use of paper fortune-tellers in England has been recorded since the 1950s. Although the phrase "cootie catcher" has been used with other meanings in the U.S. for much longer, the use of paper cootie catchers in the U.S. dates back at least to the 1960s.

References

External links

Cootie Catcher, PBS Kids
How to Make a Cootie Catcher

Fortune teller, paper
Girls' toys and games
Divination software and games
Fortune teller
Fortune teller, paper